The Dutch Eredivisie in the 1999–2000 season was contested by 18 teams. PSV won the championship.

League standings

Results

Promotion/relegation play-offs 
In the promotion/relegation competition, eight entrants (six from the Eerste Divisie and two from this league) entered in two groups. The group winners were promoted to (or remained in) the Eredivisie.

Top scorers 

 Source: worldfootball.net

See also 
 1999–2000 Eerste Divisie
 1999–2000 KNVB Cup

References 

 Eredivisie official website - info on all seasons 
 RSSSF

Eredivisie seasons
Netherlands
1999–2000 in Dutch football